Adam Henry (born in Pueblo, CO, 1974) is an American artist. He lives and works in Brooklyn, NY.

Exhibitions

Solo exhibitions
 2015 : Repetition (Repetition), Meessen De Clercq, Brussels (Belgium)
 2014 : Alien Beatnik Siren, Joe Sheftel Gallery, New York (USA)
 2013 : An aspen's inability to be a pine, Meessen De Clercq, Brussels (Belgium)
 2012 : In Spectral Form, Joe Sheftel Gallery, New York (USA)

Selected group exhibitions

2016 

 Absolute Beginners, Lucien Terras, New York (USA)
 Future Developments, David Petersen Gallery, Minneapolis (USA)
 Bewegung Auge Kopf Hand, Villa Merkel – Bahnwärterhaus, Esslingen am Neckar (Germany)
 Spirit Your Mind, curated by Marie Maertens and Anissa Touati. DAD Video program, Apple TV
 Vitreous Humour, Kansas, New York (USA)

2015 

 A.N.T.H.R.O.P.O.C.E.N.E, Meessen De Clercq, Brussels (Belgium)
 LOOM, Lucien Terras, New York (USA)
 Painting the Sky Blue, Stefan Lundgren Gallery, Palma de Mallorca (Spain)
 Crunchy, organized by Gregory Linn and Clayton Press, Marianne Boesky Gallery, New York (USA)
 Post Analog Painting, The Hole, New York (USA)
 The Two States of W.W., curated by Andrew Prayzner, TSA New York, Brooklyn (USA)

2014 

 Homo Ludens, Meessen De Clercq, Brussels (Belgium)
 This One's Optimistic: Pincushion, New Britain Museum of American Art, New Britain (USA)
 Parallax Futured: Transtemporal Subjectivities, Skirball Museum, Cincinnati (USA)
 Post-Psychedelic Dreams, Grey Area / Glenn Horowitz Bookseller, East Hampton (USA)
 Go With the Flow, The Hole, New York (USA)

2013 

 Page 179, Artforum, September 2013, Brennan & Griffin, New York (USA)
 Xtraction, The Hole, New York (USA)
 Art Los Angeles Contemporary solo presentation, Joe Sheftel Gallery, New York (USA)
 The Medium's Session, Zeitgeist, Nashville (USA)

2012 

 Workspace Program Exhibition 2012, Dieu Donné, New York (USA)
 Specifically Yours, Joe Sheftel Gallery, New York (USA)
 Retrospect, Charles Bank Gallery, New York (USA)

2011 
 
 The Third Order, Charles Bank Gallery, New York (USA)
 Anonymous Presence, Y Gallery, New York (USA)
 Painted Pictures, Blackston Gallery, New York (USA)
 Neon Sigh, Twistcooparcadia, Nashville (USA)
 In the Heavens of our Imagination…, Lost Coast Culture Machine, Fort Bragg (USA)

2010 
 
 Gradation, Portugal Arte 10-Portuguese Biennial, Lisbon (Portugal)

2009 
 
 On From Here, Guild and Greyshkul, New York (USA)
 NADA County Affair, curated by Johannes Vanderbeek, Brooklyn (USA)
 Room Tones, St Cecilia's Convent, Brooklyn (USA)
 Fortress to Solitude, 1 Grattan, curated by Guillermo Cruies, Brooklyn (USA)

2008 
 
 Blank, curated by Yi Zhou, Median Museum, Beijing (China)
 Plastic Topography, South Street Seaport Museum, New York (USA)
 The Map, curated by Vandana Jian, ROCA, Nyack (USA)

2007 
 
 Blank, Ke Center for Contemporary Art, Shanghai (China)
 Aqua Exhibition, Acuna-Hansen, Los Angeles (USA)

2006 
 
 Passport -International Globus Dislocater, Roebling Hall, Brooklyn (USA)
 Invitational, Roski Gallery, University of Southern California, Los Angeles (USA)

2005 
 
 Working Space, Cuchifritos Project Space, New York (USA)
 All of a Piece, Geoffrey Young Gallery, Great Barrington (USA)

2004 
 
 A Slow Read, Rotunda Gallery, Brooklyn (USA)
 Irrational Exuberance, Stephan Stux Gallery, New York (USA)

2003 
 
 Fresh Meat, Center for Experimental and Perceptual Art, Buffalo (USA)
 Metastisize, BRAC, Bronx (USA)
 Toward a Low End Theory, Minnesota Center for Photography, Minneapolis (USA)
 Labor Day, Rare Gallery, New York (USA)

2002 
 
 The Accelerated Grimace, Silverstein Gallery, New York (USA)
 Aim 22, Bronx Museum of the Arts, Bronx (USA)
 Love and Ardor, Geoffrey Young Gallery, Great Barrington (USA)

2000 
 
 Location, Midway Contemporary Art, Minneapolis (USA)
 Waiting List, Geoffrey Young Gallery, Great Barrington (USA)

1999 
 
 To Detail, Geoffrey Young Gallery, Great Barrington (USA)
 MFA Thesis Exhibition, Yale Art Gallery, New Haven (USA)

1998 
 
 Norfolk Art Division, Norfolk (USA)
 New Talent at Yale, Yale Art Gallery, New Haven (USA)
 Luggage Show, The Luggage Store Gallery, San Francisco (USA)
 Shrink, Southern Exposure Gallery, San Francisco (USA)

References

External links
 Official website
 Adam Henry: God Speed Speed Demon

1974 births
Artists from Colorado
Living people